Trimeresurus gracilis, commonly known as the Taiwan pit viper or Taiwan mountain pitviper, is a venomous pit viper species endemic to Taiwan. No subspecies are currently recognized.

Description
Scalation includes 19 (or 21) rows of dorsal scales at midbody, 144–149 ventral scales, 43–53 subcaudal scales, and 7–8 supralabial scales.

Geographic range
The type locality given is "Mt. Noko, Nanto". According to Zhao and Adler (1993), this would be "Mt. Nôkô, Nanto Co., central Formosa" (Mount Nengkaoshan, Nantou County, Taiwan).
In a study were results that negated a commonly believed inference relating to the close affinity of T. monticola and T. okinawensis, and also suggested a sister relationship between T. okinawensis and T. gracilis. Phylogenetic relationships revealed in this study suggested that the genus Trimeresurus dispersed into the Ryukyu region at least three times, and that T. flavoviridis and T. tularensis from the central Ryukyus use to be more widespread and diverse in the past surrounding regions.

References

Further reading
 Ōshima, M. 1920. Notes on the Venomous Snakes from the Islands of Formosa and Riu Kiu. Annual Report of the Institute of Science, Government of Formosa. 8 (2): 1-99. ("Trimeresurus gracilis sp. nov.", pp. 10–11 + Plate XII, Figures 5 & 6.)
 Zhao, Er-mi, and Kraig Adler. 1993. Herpetology of China. Society for the Study of Amphibians and Reptiles (SSAR). Oxford, Ohio. 522 pp. .

gracilis
Snakes of Asia
Reptiles of Taiwan
Endemic fauna of Taiwan
Reptiles described in 1920